Telestes karsticus  is a species of freshwater fish in the family Cyprinidae.
It is endemic to Croatia.

References

Telestes
Fish described in 2011